The Canton of Envermeu is a former canton situated in the Seine-Maritime département and in the Haute-Normandie region of northern France. It was disbanded following the French canton reorganisation which came into effect in March 2015. It had a total of 17,758 inhabitants (2012).

Geography 
A farming area in the arrondissement of Dieppe, centred on the town of Envermeu. The altitude varies from 0m (Biville-sur-Mer) to 196m (Notre-Dame-d'Aliermont) for an average altitude of 90m.

The canton comprised 30 communes:

Assigny
Auquemesnil
Avesnes-en-Val
Bailly-en-Rivière
Bellengreville
Biville-sur-Mer
Brunville
Dampierre-Saint-Nicolas
Douvrend
Envermeu
Freulleville
Glicourt
Gouchaupre
Greny
Guilmécourt
Les Ifs
Intraville
Meulers
Notre-Dame-d'Aliermont
Penly
Ricarville-du-Val
Saint-Aubin-le-Cauf
Saint-Jacques-d'Aliermont
Saint-Martin-en-Campagne
Saint-Nicolas-d'Aliermont
Saint-Ouen-sous-Bailly
Saint-Quentin-au-Bosc
Saint-Vaast-d'Équiqueville
Sauchay
Tourville-la-Chapelle

Population

See also 
 Arrondissements of the Seine-Maritime department
 Cantons of the Seine-Maritime department
 Communes of the Seine-Maritime department

References

Envermeu
2015 disestablishments in France
States and territories disestablished in 2015